Nireekshana is a 1986 Indian Telugu-language romantic drama film co-written, directed, filmed, and edited by Balu Mahendra. Produced by Linga Raju, the film stars Bhanu Chander and Archana. Allu Ramalingaiah, P. L. Narayana and Rallapalli play supporting roles. The music was composed by Ilaiyaraaja. The film was remade into Tamil as Adhu Oru Kana Kaalam (2005). The film won two Nandi Awards. The film was dubbed and released in Tamil, under the title Kanne Kalaimane.

Plot 
The story unfolds as Murali Krishna (Bhanu Chandra), a convict, now free from jail, tells his tragic love story to his fellow passengers ina school bus. An orphan and a forest officer by profession, he falls in love with a local tribal woman, Tulasi (Archana), during his stay at a forest area. They decided to get married, and he sets off to tell his best friend about his plans.

On his way back, the police inspector (Narra Venkateswara Rao) arrest him as a suspected naxalite criminal, who looks similar to Murali Krishna. There he accidentally kills a policeman and gets life imprisonment. During his early days at jail, he writes a letter to Tulasi asking her to forget him. When his prison term was about to complete, he writes a letter to see if she waits for him. After long years of torment in the jail he goes to meet Thulasi. Does she still wait for him? That's the question of his fellow passengers, too. At the end, she does wait for him, and welcomes him with lamps.

Cast 

 Bhanu Chander as Murali Krishna (forest officer)
 Archana as Tulasi (tribal woman)
P. L. Narayana as Tulasi's father
 Allu Ramalingaiah as Church Father
 Narra Venkateswara Rao as D. Arjun Rao (Inspector)
 Kaikala Satyanarayana as Jailer
 Nirmalamma
 P. J. Sarma
 B. Saroja Devi
 Ranjitha
 K. K. Sarma
 Anju
 Preethi
 Keerthy Meenakshi
 Sumathi
 Malleswari
 Seethalakshmi

Production 
Archana acted for most of the film without wearing a blouse. The film was also inspired by the human rights violations that occurred during the Emergency period (1975–77).

Soundtrack 
The music and background score was composed by Ilaiyaraaja. The lyrics were written by Aatreya. The audio was published digitally by Aditya Music and Mango Music.

Reception 
Reviewing the Tamil-dubbed version Kanne Kalaimaane, Jayamanmadhan of Kalki appreciated Balu Mahendra's cinematography, said Archana had incredible eyes, and Bhanu Chander was "o.k".

Accolades 
Balu Mahendra won the Best Cinematographer, and Archana won the Special Jury Award.

References

External links 
 

1980s Telugu-language films
1986 films
1986 romantic drama films
Films directed by Balu Mahendra
Films scored by Ilaiyaraaja
Films set in Andhra Pradesh
Films shot in Andhra Pradesh
Films shot in Ooty
Telugu films remade in other languages